Open Bar Entertainment is an American record label founded in 1995 by Xzibit.

History
Xzibit stated "I started a label called Open Bar, being that I gotta take advantage of everything that's happening around me right now, I just feel like Likwit Crew never got our fair share in the market place. Whether it was us, whether it was the promotion, whether it was the label...that's not for me to argue about. But what I can do is, since I got my hands around the opportunity, I'll of course, embrace my family members and bring them to the table with me. The first person I signed was King Tee. I also signed Defari and I'm bringing the Golden State Warriors over there. So I'm gonna go ahead and we're going to develop them, and bring them into the circle, putting my family together, coming out correctly."

Current artists
Xzibit

Discography
Restless
Man Vs. Machine
Weapons of Mass Destruction
Xposed DVD
Full Circle
Napalm

References

See also
 List of record labels

American record labels
Record labels established in 1995
Hip hop record labels
Vanity record labels